Israel participated in the Junior Eurovision Song Contest 2016 which took place on 20 November 2016, in Valletta, Malta. The Israeli broadcaster Israel Broadcasting Authority (IBA) was responsible for organising their entry for the contest. This was Israel's second appearance at the Junior Eurovision Song Contest.

Background

Before Junior Eurovision
The EBU published the final list of participating countries on 28 September 2016, in which Israel appeared within the participating list for the contest which takes place on 20 November 2016, in Valletta, Malta. On 26 October 2016, Shir & Tim were selected to represent Israel. On 8 November 2016, it was revealed that they were to perform the song "Follow My Heart", written by Noam Horev, who is also credited with having written the lyrics for "Milim", Israel's entry in the Eurovision Song Contest 2010.

Artist and song information

Shira Frieman and TimoTi Sannikov (Shir & Tim)

Shira Frieman (born 4 April 2003) is an Israeli child singer who, prior to representing Israel in the Junior Eurovision Song Contest 2016, has participated in "The Music School", a music competition for children. Besides singing, Frieman plays the saxophone and dances to jazz music.

TimoTi Sannikov (born 20 August 2003) is an Israeli child singer who has participated in several music festivals, including Being a Star and Slavic Bazaar. He also plays the role of Michael in the Israeli production of Billy Elliot the Musical. In 2016, he participated in The Voice Kids Ukraine and represented Israel in the Junior Eurovision Song Contest.

Follow My Heart
"Follow My Heart" is a song by Israeli singers Shira Frieman and TimoTi Sannikov. It represented Israel during the Junior Eurovision Song Contest 2016. It is composed and written by Dor Daniel and Noam Horev. It ended in 15th place with 27 points.

At Junior Eurovision
During the opening ceremony and the running order draw which took place on 14 November 2016, Israel was drawn to perform thirteenth on 20 November 2015, following Serbia and preceding Australia.

Final
Tim sung the first verse and chorus from stage-left. The beginning of the second verse was sung by Shir from centre-stage. Tim joined Shir at centre-stage and the duo completed the song in unison against a backdrop of a moving cluster of stars.

Voting
During the press conference for the Junior Eurovision Song Contest 2016, held in Stockholm, the Reference Group announced several changes to the voting format for the 2016 contest. Previously, points had been awarded based on a combination of 50% National juries and 50% televoting, with one more set of points also given out by a 'Kids' Jury'. For the first time since the inauguration of the contest the voting procedure will not include a public televote. Following these results, three expert jurors will also announce their points from 1–8, 10, and 12. These professional jurors are: Christer Björkman, Mads Grimstad, and Jedward.

References

Junior Eurovision Song Contest
Israel
Junior 2016